The London Topographical Society was founded as the Topographical Society of London in 1880 to publish "material illustrating the history and topography of the City and County of London from the earliest times to the present day". Its journal, the London Topographical Record, has been published irregularly since 1880. It is a registered charity, number 271590.

References

External links
 Official website
 "The Role of a Topographical Society", by Simon Morris, 1995

Clubs and societies in London
1880 establishments in England
History of London
Small press publishing companies
Historical societies of the United Kingdom
Text publication societies
Heritage organisations in the United Kingdom
History organisations based in the United Kingdom
Book publishing companies of England
Regional and local learned societies of the United Kingdom
History books about London